The Súrih-i-Ghusn or Tablet of the Branch is a tablet written in Arabic by Baháʼu'lláh, founder of the Baháʼí Faith, in Adrianople between 1864 and 1868 CE. It clearly confirms a high station for ʻAbdu'l-Bahá (titled "the Branch of Holiness"). An authorized English translation by the Baháʼí World Centre was published in the volume Days of Remembrance in 2017.

See also
Kitáb-i-Aqdas
Lawḥ-i-Arḍ-i-Bá (Tablet of the Land of Bá) 
Kitáb-i-ʻAhd (Book of the Covenant)

Further reading
 Related documents on Baháʼí Library Online

External links
Compendium of the Tablet of the Branch

Works by Baháʼu'lláh
1867 books
1867 in religion